The League of Ireland U19 Division is the under-19 division of the League of Ireland.  The current division is the successor of earlier U21 and U20 divisions. Like the Premier Division and First Division, the U19 Division is currently sponsored by Airtricity and as a result it is also known as the SSE Airtricity U19 League. The earlier U21 and U20 divisions were sponsored by Eircom and as a result were referred to as the Eircom U21 League or the Eircom U20 League. The division is also sometimes referred to as the Dr Tony O'Neill League because the winners are awarded the Dr Tony O'Neill Cup. In 2016 Cork City  became the first team to represent the division in the UEFA Youth League.

History

Eircom U21 League
The inaugural season of the U21 division took place in 2000–01 and St Patrick's Athletic finished as the first champions. In 2001–02 Waterford United won the title before Cork City won their first title in 2002–03. City then retained the title in 2003–04. UCD subsequently won three of four remaining titles during the U21 era. As well as featuring the youth teams of contemporary League of Ireland clubs, the division also featured the representative teams of junior leagues such as the Kerry District League, the Mayo Association Football League and the Sligo/Leitrim League. In 2004 Sligo/Leitrim reached the final of the Enda McGuill Cup. In addition to featuring UCD, the division also featured three other university teams – NUI Galway, the University of Limerick and Dublin University. The division was also used by the League of Ireland as an avenue for future members of its senior divisions. Both Salthill Devon and Mervue United began their League of Ireland careers in the U21 division. In 2003 Mervue United were Enda McGuill Cup finalists and in 2006 Salthill Devon became the first club to win the Dr Tony O'Neill Cup without having a team in the senior divisions. In addition to competing for the Dr Tony O'Neill Cup and the Enda McGuill Cup, teams in the U21 division also played in several other competitions including pre-season tournaments in 2006 and 2007 and a futsal league in 2007 which was won by Shamrock Rovers. This latter competition evolved into the FAI Futsal Cup.

Eircom U20 League 
In 2008, as part of a restructuring of the League of Ireland that also saw the introduction of the A Championship, the U21 division was relaunched as a U20 division. The new division featured the youth teams of the 22 clubs in the Premier Division and First Division plus four other teams – F.C. Carlow, Kilkenny City, Salthill Devon and Mervue United.
Cork City were the first U20 champions in 2008–09 followed by UCD in 2009. In 2010 Andrew Myler guided Shamrock Rovers to their first title.

Airtricity U19 League
During the U19 era Cork City have established themselves as the dominant team, winning the Dr Tony O'Neill Cup four seasons out of five and winning the Enda McGuill Cup on three occasions. In 2016 Cork City also became the first team to represent the division in the UEFA Youth League.

Format
During the U21 and U20 eras teams playing in the division were divided into four regionalised groups, more or less corresponding to North and South Leinster, Munster and Connacht/Ulster. The top two teams from each group then qualified for the quarter-finals and the remainder of the competition was decided on a knock-out basis. Between 2011–12 and 2013–14 teams playing in the division were divided into the three groups. One of these groups, the Elite Division, was a national division. The remaining teams were divided into Southern and Northern divisions. During these three seasons the winners of the Elite Division were awarded the Dr Tony O'Neill Cup. The 2014–15 season saw the introduction of two regional divisions known as the Northern Elite Division and the Southern Elite Division and a play-off system was again used to decide the overall champions. The 2015 season featured three regional groups simply numbered one to three. The 2016 season saw the return of the Northern Elite Division and the Southern Elite Division format.

Teams

Northern Elite Division

Southern Elite Division

Dr Tony O'Neill Cup
The main league championship trophy is named after Dr Tony O'Neill, the former general manager of University College Dublin A.F.C. O'Neill was a founding member of the Irish Universities Football Union, a former general secretary of the FAI and a member of  various UEFA committees. He also served as Director of Sport at UCD and was credited with revitalising sport at the university following the introduction of a scholarship scheme. This competition should not be confused with the other Dr Tony O'Neill Cup, a national competition organised by the FAI for schools teams. 
 

Notes

Enda McGuill Cup
The Enda McGuill Memorial Cup is the division's league cup. It is named after Enda McGuill, a former   
chairman of Dundalk F.C. and a former president of the League of Ireland.

Notes

League of Ireland U19 Champions

Player Of The Season

Selected former teams
The vast majority of teams that have competed in the division have been the youth teams of League of Ireland clubs. The following clubs and representative teams have also competed without ever having entered a team in either the Premier Division or the First Division.

References

External links
  League of Ireland U19 Division on Facebook

Youth association football in the Republic of Ireland
Ireland
U19
2000 establishments in Ireland
Sports leagues established in 2000
Ireland